Dendropsophus haddadi is a species of frog in the family Hylidae. It is endemic to eastern Brazil, with its distribution ranging from northern Espírito Santo to Bahia, Sergipe, Alagoas, Pernambuco. The specific name haddadi honors , a Brazilian ecologist and herpetologist.

Description
Adult males measure  and adult females  in snout–vent length. The snout is short. The tympanum is distinct and relatively large. The canthus rostralis is distinct. The fingers and toes have rounded discs and are partially webbed. Dorsal coloration is variable, but most individuals are dark brown with white snout and stripes running laterally to the inguinal region.

Habitat and conservation
Dendropsophus haddadi occurs in coastal rainforest and in scrubby coastal "restinga" vegetation, as well as in gardens, farmland, and towns, at elevations below . It breeds in permanent bonds and can be spotted on vegetation around these. It is a common and very adaptable species that is not facing any threats. It is present in many protected areas.

References

haddadi
Amphibians of Brazil
Endemic fauna of Brazil
Amphibians described in 1996
Taxonomy articles created by Polbot